Cerovica is a settlement in the Municipality of Šmartno pri Litiji in central Slovenia. It lies east of Šmartno on the regional road to Mirna. The area is part of the historical region of Lower Carniola. The municipality is now included in the Central Slovenia Statistical Region.

Name
Cerovica was attested in historical sources as Corowitz in 1343.

References

External links
Cerovica at Geopedia

Populated places in the Municipality of Šmartno pri Litiji